Cyrtodactylus hamidyi (Hamidy's bent-toed gecko) is a species of bent toed gecko endemic to Kalimantan, Indonesia.

References

Cyrtodactylus
Reptiles described in 2021